The 152nd Infantry Regiment is an infantry regiment in the Indiana Army National Guard, part of the 76th Infantry Brigade Combat Team (United States).

History

American Civil War 
In 1864, eleven infantry regiments were ordered to muster for one year of service in the American Civil War. Under that call, the 152nd Infantry Regiment mustered in Indianapolis, Indiana under the command of Colonel Whedon W. Griswold. The 152nd recruited in the 9th, 10th and 11th Congressional districts and raised 988 soldiers.

The regiment left Indiana on March 18 for Harper's Ferry, West Virginia where it was assigned to the Army of the Shenandoah. The regiment was stationed in Charles Town, Stephenson's Station and Summit Point, later moving to Clarksburg, West Virginia.

The regiment mustered out on Aug. 30, 1865.

World War One 
The 2nd Infantry, Indiana National Guard, was called into federal service 25 March 1917; and mustered into federal service 20 April 1917 at Jeffersonville. Drafted into federal service 5 August 1917.

Reorganized and redesignated 1 October 1917 as the 152d Infantry and assigned to the 38th Division.

Demobilized 8 March 1919 at Camp Zachary Taylor, Kentucky.

Consolidated in 1921 with the 137th Field Artillery (organized in 1846); consolidated unit reorganize in the Indiana National Guard as the 152d Infantry and assigned in the 38th Division; Headquarters federally recognized 15 November 1921 at Indianapolis.

World War Two

Formation 
Inducted into federal service 17 January 1941 as an element of the 38th Infantry Division, the 152nd Infantry Regiment conducted basic training at Camp Shelby, Mississippi with additional training at Camp Carrabelle, Florida, Camp Livingston, Louisiana and Hawaii.

Battle of Baatan (1945)

Background 
In January 1942, the Imperial Japanese Army and Navy invaded Luzon, the largest island in the Philippines. Shortly after the invasion, General Douglas MacArthur consolidated all his Luzon-based units on to the Bataan peninsula in an effort to make a last stand and delay the Japanese invasion of the rest Asia Pacific. After nearly three months of fighting, more than 10,000 American and Filipino forces were killed and 76,000 were imprisoned. The captured prisoners were then forcibly marched more than 60 miles through the jungle to various POW camps in an event known as the Bataan Death March. Deaths from the march range from 5,650 and 18,000.

The Recapture of Bataan 
In January 1945, the 38th and 24th Infantry Divisions were ordered to clear Japanese forces from the Bataan peninsula.

The 34th Infantry Regiment reinforced the front lines held by Filipino guerrilla fighters at the northern base of the Bataan peninsula, allowing the 149th, 151st and 152nd Infantry Regiments to move south and east into the peninsula.

On February 1, the 152nd Infantry Regiment approached Japanese strong-points at "Horseshoe Bend." After two days of heavy fighting, resulting in high casualties for the regiment, all eastward progress had stopped.

The 34th Infantry then reinforced the 152nd Infantry and after more than two weeks of hard fighting the 149th, 152nd Infantry Regiments finally linked up clearing the peninsula of Japanese forces.

The recapture of the Bataan peninsula enabled American forces full use of Manila Bay and its world-class deep water port. This development subsequently allowed the easy resupply of American forces retaking Manila. The operation was so significant that General Douglas MacArthur personally dubbed the soldiers of the 38th Infantry Division as the “Avengers of Bataan.”

Post-World War Two 
Reorganized (less 3d Battalion) and federally recognized 23 May 1947 with headquarters at Evansville. 3rd Battalion [former 137th Field Artillery] reorganized and federally recognized 30 December 1947 as the 293d Infantry hereafter separate lineage.

Reorganized 1 February 1959 as a parent regiment under the Combat Arms Regimental System consist of the 1st and 2d Battle Groups, elements of the 38th Infantry Division.

Reorganized 1 March 1963
 Headquarters/Headquarters Company - New Albany, Indiana
 Alpha Company - New Albany, Indiana
 Bravo Company - Tell City, Indiana
 Charlie Company - Salem, Indiana
Reorganized 1 November 1965 as follows: 2nd Battalion (Mechanized), 152nd Infantry Regiment to consist of HHC (-) (Shelbyville), HHC (Greensburg), Co A (-) (Seymour), Co A (Connersville), Co B (-) (Martinsville), Co B (Columbus), Co C (-) (Salem), Co C (Scottsburg).  1st Battalion, 152nd Infantry Regiment to consist of HHC (Jasper), HHC (Jasper), Co A (Vincennes), Co B (Linton), Co C (Tell City), Co D (Washington). 

2nd Battalion reorganized 1 December 1967 to consist of HHC (Shelbyville), Co A (-) (Richmond), Co A (Connersville), Co B (Martinsville), Co C (New Castle).

2nd Battalion reorganized and redesignated 1 February 1972 with Co A (-) (Richmond) and Co A as Spt Co (Connersville). 1st Battalion, 152nd Infantry Regiment to consist of headquarters (Jasper), HHC (Jasper), Co A (Vincennes), Co B (Linton), Co C (Tell City), Co D (Washington).

Location of Headquarters 2nd Battalion 152nd Infantry (Mechanized) changed 1 March 1977 to Camp Atterbury; on 1 November 1979 to Columbus. 

2nd Battalion reorganized and redesignated 1 September 1987 with Spt as Co E (AA) (Connersville) and organized Co D (Connersville)

Reorganized and redesignated 1 April 1995 with the location of 2nd Battalion headquarters changed to Marion Indiana, HHC (Marion), Co A (Warsaw), Co B (Winchester), Co C (New Castle), Co D (Muncie), Co E (Connersville).  1st Battalion, 152nd Infantry Regiment to consist of headquarters (Jasper), HHC (Jasper), Co A(-)(Linton), Det 1 Co A (Vincennes), Co B (Martinsville), Co C (Tell City), Co D (Washington).

Iraq War

Late 2002, 76th Infantry Brigade mobilized two battalions to provide support for an escalating campaign in the Middle East. 1st Battalion, 152nd Infantry "Predators" mobilized at Camp Atterbury, Indiana on 2 January 2003 and deployed to Kuwait in mid-February 2003. On D+5 1st Battalion, 293rd Infantry Regiment was called on to move north to support Operation Iraqi Freedom, with the temporary attachment of Company A, 1st Battalion 152nd Infantry, to the vicinity of Tallil Air Base near the city of An Nasiriyah, Iraq.  The 1st Battalion, 152nd Infantry employed companies in Baghdad (initially in support of 5th Special Forces Group), Forward Operating Base Kalsu (approximately 30 miles south of Baghdad in the "Sunni Triangle"), and Convoy Service Center Scania, both of which were along Main Supply Route (MSR) Tampa. In January 2004, 1st Battalion 152nd Infantry was replaced by 2nd Battalion, 505th Parachute Infantry Regiment and redeployed to Indiana in February 2004.

From October 2006 to September 2007, Headquarters and Headquarters Company "Team Gator", 2nd Battalion, 152nd Infantry Regiment was operationally assigned as an expeditionary force attached to 1st Brigade Combat Team, 1st Armored Division, with one platoon assigned under the tactical control of United States Marine Corps Regimental Combat Teams.

Team Gator conducted extensive joint combat patrols and enemy clearing operations in both the Ramadi and Fallujah during the some of the most intense fighting of the Iraq campaign.

When 1st Brigade Combat Team, 1st Armored Division departed Ramadi, Team Gator would be assigned to 1st Brigade Combat Team, 3rd Infantry Division (United States) and would participate in major clearing operations during the Iraq War troop surge of 2007.

Team Gator opened 8 new police stations in Al Anbar Province, including Ramadi and Fallujah; participated in 8 battalion-sized enemy clearing operations; conducted hundreds of joint patrols with Iraqi Security Forces, and killed or captured more than enemy 100 insurgents.

Soldiers in Team Gator received 34 Purple Hearts, 27 Bronze Star Medals (two valor device). The company received the Naval Unit Commendation and the Meritorious Unit Commendation.

Team Gator suffered one K.I.A., SSG Bradley D. King, killed on 2 April 2007, by an improvised explosive device during a raid on a known bomb maker's house in the village of Fuhaylat.

Current structure

2nd Battalion, 152nd Infantry (2-152nd Infantry) 
 Headquarters and Headquarters Company (HHC) - Columbus, Indiana
 Alpha Company - Indianapolis, Indiana
 Bravo Company - Greenfield, Indiana
 Charlie Company - Danville, Indiana
 Delta Company - Bluffton, Indiana

References

Infantry regiments of the United States Army
Infantry regiments of the United States Army National Guard
Military units and formations established in 1864